Ghost pipe is a common name for several plants and may refer to:

Monotropa uniflora
Orobanche uniflora, native to North America